Claus Michael Ringel (born 10 February 1945 in Zwickau) is a German mathematician, specializing in algebra.

Education and career
Ringel studied mathematics, physics and philosophy beginning in 1964 at the Goethe University Frankfurt with the Diplom degree in mathematics in 1968. He received in 1969 from the Goethe University Frankfurt his doctorate under the supervision of Friedrich-Wilhelm Bauer with thesis Diagonalisierungspaare in der Homologischen Algebra (Diagonalization Pairs in Homological Algebra). He then became a research assistant at the University of Tübingen and in 1971/72 an assistant professor at  Carleton University (where he collaborated with Vlastimil Dlab). In 1972 he habilitated in Tübingen and became there a Universitätsdozent. 

In 1974 Ringel became a scientific advisor and professor at the University of Bonn. From 1978 until his retirement in 2010, he was a professor at Bielefeld University. From 2010 to 2013 he was a visiting professor at Shanghai Jiao Tong University. Since 2000 he has occasionally been a visiting professor at the University of Science and Technology of China in Hefei, and since 2011 he has occasionally taught as an adjunct professor at King Abdulaziz University in Jeddah.

Research
Ringel's research deals with the representation theory of algebras. From 1991 to 2000 he led the project Representation of Algebras and from 1995 to 2000 the project Structure of Quantum Groups in the Collaborative Research Center 343's Discrete Structures in Mathematics; he also led the project Topological and Spectral Structures in Representation Theory in the Collaborative Research Center 701's Spectral Structures and Topological Methods in Mathematics. He has published over 140 papers (2005) and was ranked  Highly Cited Researcher  at the ISI in 2004.

Ringel was elected a Fellow of the American Mathematical Society in 2012. He was an Invited Speaker at the International Congress of Mathematicians in 1983 in Warsaw with talk Indecomposable representations of finite-dimensional algebras.
He is a member of the Norwegian Academy of Science and Letters and honorary doctor of the Norwegian University of Science and Technology in Trondheim.

In 2005/06 he was chair of the Review Board for Mathematics at the Deutsche Forschungsgemeinschaft.

Selected publications

Articles
 
 Unzerlegbare Darstellungen endlich-dimensionaler Algebren, Jahresbericht DMV 85 (1983), 86–105
 
 Hall algebras and quantum groups, Inventions Mathematicae 100, no. 1 (1990), 583–591 
 Hall algebras, Banach Center Publications 26, no. 1 (1990): 433–447
 Recent advances in the theory of finite dimensional algebras. (1984-1990), Progress in Mathematics 95, Birkhäuser 1991, pp. 141–192 
 
 The elementary 3-Kronecker modules, arXiv:1612.09141v (2016)

Books
 with Vlastimil Dlab:  Indecomposable representations of graphs and algebras , AMS 1976
 Tame Algebras and Integral Quadratic Forms, Springer Verlag 1984; 
 with Vlastimil Dlab: Representations of finite dimensional algebra and related topics in Lie theory and geometry, AMS 2004
 as editor with Henning Krause: Infinite Length Modules, Birkhäuser 2000

References

External links
 Homepage
 Geburtstag in Bielefeld, Pressemitteilung der Universität Bielefeld 2005

20th-century German mathematicians
21st-century German mathematicians
Goethe University Frankfurt alumni
Academic staff of the University of Bonn
Academic staff of Bielefeld University
Members of the Norwegian Academy of Science and Letters
Fellows of the American Mathematical Society
People from Zwickau
1945 births
Living people